PMPC Star Awards for Best Single Performance by an Actor and Actress is given to the actor and actress who brilliantly performed in a miniseries, Movie made for television and alike.

Winners

Actors with Multiple Awards

Actress with Multiple Awards

PMPC Star Awards for Television